Thousand Foot Falls is a waterfall and natural monument in Cayo, Belize. It is surrounded by the Mountain Pine Ridge Forest Reserve.
The Thousand Foot Falls is thought to be the highest waterfall in the Central American region. Despite what its name suggests, this massive waterfall is actually 1,600 ft tall.

References
 

Waterfalls of Belize
Parks in Belize
Protected areas established in 2004